Mehdiabad (also Romanized as 'Mehdīābād; also known as Mehdīābād-e ‘Āmerī) is a village in Rigan Rural District, in the Central District of Rigan County, Kerman Province, Iran. At the 2006 census, its population was 1,014, in 234 families.

References 

Populated places in Rigan County